Aleksandr Illarionovich Yefremov (23 April 1904 – 23 November 1951) was a Soviet statesman, party figure and Chairman of the Executive Committee of the Moscow City Council of Workers', Peasants' and Red Armymen's Deputies (today's equivalent of mayor) from 3 November 1938 to 14 April 1939.

Life and career
Aleksandr Yefremov was born in Moscow in 1904 into the family of a factory worker. In 1916, he began to work as a mechanic helper, later on becoming a mechanic proper at a railway shop. In 1924, he joined the Russian Communist Party (Bolsheviks).

In 1935, he graduated from the STANKIN and worked as a shop foreman, shop superintendent, and then finally as a director of a machine-tool factory named after Sergo Ordzhonikidze. In 1938–1939, Aleksandr Yefremov held the posts of a deputy chairman of the Moscow City Council and then chairman of the Moscow Oblast Executive Committee and chairman of the Moscow City Council. Yefremov contributed to the construction of the third stage of the Moscow Metro and All-Union Agricultural Exhibition. In 1939, he became a member of the Central Committee of the VKP(b). 

From 1939 to 1941, Aleksandr Yefremov held the posts of the first deputy and then Minister of Heavy Machine Building of the Soviet Union. In 1941–1949, he was People's Commissar and then Minister of Machine-Tool Industry. In 1946, Yefremov became a member of the Presidium of the Supreme Soviet of the Russian Soviet Federative Socialist Republic. He was also a Deputy of the Supreme Soviet of the Soviet Union of the 2nd and 3rd convocations and a deputy of the Supreme Soviet of Russia of the 1st and 2nd convocations. From March 8, 1949 to November 23, 1951, Aleksandr Yefremov held the post of the Deputy Chairman of the Council of Ministers of the Soviet Union.

Aleksandr Yefremov died in Moscow in 1951 and was interred in the Kremlin Wall Necropolis. He was awarded the Order of Lenin twice, the Order of Kutuzov (2nd class), the Order of the Red Banner of Labour, and several medals.

References 

1904 births
1951 deaths
Politicians from Moscow
Central Committee of the Communist Party of the Soviet Union members
Chairpersons of the Executive Committee of Mossovet
People's commissars and ministers of the Soviet Union
Second convocation members of the Supreme Soviet of the Soviet Union
Third convocation members of the Supreme Soviet of the Soviet Union
Recipients of the Order of Kutuzov, 2nd class
Recipients of the Order of Lenin
Recipients of the Order of the Red Banner of Labour
Russian mechanical engineers
Soviet mechanical engineers
Burials at the Kremlin Wall Necropolis